The California Tax Education Council (CTEC) is a private nonprofit quasi-public benefit organization that is mandated by the State of California. CTEC is responsible for providing a list of its approved tax education providers and verifying nonexempt tax preparers have met the state’s minimum requirements to prepare tax returns for a fee.

The responsibility for approving tax schools was transferred from the California Department of Consumer Affairs to CTEC by the California State Legislature and Governor, effective July 1, 1997.

Summary

In 1996, the California State Legislature passed the Tax Preparers Act in an effort to help protect taxpayers against fraudulent and incompetent tax preparers.

A tax preparer is defined as “a person who, for a fee, assists with or prepares tax returns for another person or who assumes final responsibility for completed work on a return on which preliminary work has been done by another person, or who holds himself or herself out as offering those services.”

A tax return is defined as “a return, declaration, statement, refund claim, or other document required to be made or filed in connection with state or federal income taxes or state bank and corporation franchise taxes.”

The Tax Preparers Act requires anyone (excluding attorneys, certified public accountants and enrolled agents) who prepares or assists with preparing federal and state tax returns for a fee to register with CTEC. All CTEC Registered Tax Preparers (CRTPs) must complete tax education courses each year and maintain a $5,000 surety bond to protect clients against fraud.

Anyone caught preparing tax returns illegally may face penalties up to $5,000 from the California Franchise Tax Board, the enforcement arm of CTEC.

Legislative Authority

Chapter 14  California Business & Professions Code Section 22250-22259

CTEC Registered Tax Preparers (CRTPs)

To become a CTEC Registered Tax Preparer (CRTP), each applicant has to complete a 60-hour qualifying education course from a CTEC-approved education provider.  Approved education providers are listed on the CTEC website www.ctec.org.

Applicants have 18 months from the date of completing the course to register, purchase a bond and become a CRTP. Applicants waiting longer than 18 months have to retake the 60-hour course and exam. CRTPs must renew their CTEC registration by October 31 of each year.

Initial Registration

•	Take a 60-hour qualifying education course that consist of 45 hours federal tax law and 15 hours state tax law, then pass a competency exam administered by a CTEC-approved education provider.

•	Purchase a $5,000 tax preparer surety bond.

•	Submit the application to CTEC and pay the $33 registration fee.

•	After the information has been finalized and verified, CTEC will issue the tax preparer a Certificate of Completion and identification card showing the current year, their name and CTEC number, which always starts with an “A.”

Renewal Registration

•	Complete a 20-hour continuing education course on federal and state tax laws from a CTEC-approved education provider(s)

•	Maintain a $5,000 tax preparer surety bond

•	Submit a renewal application to CTEC.  The registration fee is $33 and must be renewed by the October 31st deadline.

•	Every year CRTPs receive a compliance certificate and identification card showing the current year, their name and CTEC number, which always starts with an “A.”

As of 2011, more than 43,000 CRTPs registered with CTEC. Consumers can verify the status of a CRTP by visiting www.ctec.org or call CTEC toll free at 877-850-2832. Consumers can report unregistered tax preparers by filling out the Noncompliant Complaint Form through CTEC’s website. All reports are kept confidential.

Approved Education Providers

In order to implement the Tax Preparers Act, CTEC developed an application process for approving individuals and tax schools as CTEC-approved education providers. Applicants must submit the all documents pertaining to becoming an education provider, including the course(s) they would like approved. CTEC policy CP-02 requires that CTEC send written notice within 120 days determining if the applicant’s course(s) have been approved or denied.

To become and maintain the status of being an approved education provider, an applicant must also: 
 
 Have and maintain, during the application period and subsequent approval period, an established physical place of business.
 Provide an inquiry response plan for responding timely to students and CTEC.
 Have and maintain, during the application period and subsequent approval period, an established business phone during regular business hours.

Should the Curriculum Provider Standards Committee decide to suspend an education provider’s approved status or reduce its advertised education credits, the education provider must, within 14 business days, provide CTEC with a list of students affected by the suspension or reduction of credits. 
 
Failure to abide by the above standards may terminate an education provider’s approved status.

In addition to the above requirements, all CTEC-approved education providers must submit different education courses for periodic review every three years to verify that its courses continue to meet CTEC standards and policies. A list of approved education providers can be found at www.ctec.org.

Administrative Responsibilities

The CTEC Board of Directors is composed of unpaid volunteers appointed to the board by certain Qualified Organizations. The board includes several committees that carryout the duties of the council. Each qualified organization may appoint one representative. A qualified organization is defined as:

 A professional society, association or other entity operating as a California nonprofit corporation that chooses to participate on the board of directors. The organization must represent tax preparers, enrolled agents, attorneys or certified public accountants with a membership of at least 200 for the past three years.
 A for-profit tax preparation corporation that chooses to participate on the board of directors. The corporation must consist of at least 200 employees and has operated in California for the past three years.

Research & References: 22251(d)  A "tax education council" means a single organization made up of not more than one representative from each professional society, association, or other entity operating as a California nonprofit corporation which chooses to participate in the council and which represents tax preparers, enrolled agents, attorneys, or certified public accountants with a membership of at least 200 for the last three years, and not more than one representative from each for-profit tax preparation corporation which chooses to participate in the council and which has at least 200 employees and has been operating in California for the past three years.

Notice—Organizations or corporations that meet the qualifications and would like to appoint a representative to the CTEC board should contact the CTEC Administrator. The CTEC administrator oversees and performs the daily work of the council. The CTEC administrator is under a contract awarded by the board of directors.

CTEC Mission Statement

"In order to provide for the public benefit, the California Tax Education Council (CTEC) will continue to establish professional tax education standards, approve tax education providers who comply with these standards and facilitate tax preparer compliance for the benefit of California taxpayers”

Trademark

CTEC® is a registered trademark owned by the California Tax Education Council. The trademark is used for reviewing standards and practices to assure compliance with tax preparation laws and regulations.

References 

Official California Legislative Information

State of California Franchise Tax Board

Taxpayer groups